Paul Matthews van Buren (April 20, 1924 – June 18, 1998) was a Christian theologian and author. An ordained Episcopal priest, he was a Professor of religion at Temple University, Philadelphia for 22 years.   He was a Director [NYT obituary says "Associate"] of the Center of Ethics and Religious Pluralism at the Shalom Hartman Institute in Jerusalem.

He died of cancer on June 18, 1998 at age 74.

Early life 
Van Buren was born and raised in Norfolk, Virginia. During World War II, he had served in the United States Coast Guard.

Career
Van Buren attended Harvard College, from which he graduated with a bachelor's degree in government, in 1948. He then attended the Episcopal Theological School, and received a bachelor's in sacred theology in 1951. It was after this that he was ordained as an Episcopal priest in the Diocese of Massachusetts. He received a Th.D. in theology in 1957 from the University of Basel in Switzerland studying under Karl Barth.  A professor at Temple University, he was considered a leader of the "Death of God" school or movement, although he himself rejected that name for the movement as a "journalistic invention," and considered himself an exponent of "Secular Christianity."

Later, however, Van Buren expressed criticism of the approach that he and others had taken to accommodate the Christian faith to an increasingly secular culture. Writing in 1980, Van Buren stated:

Works 
Below is an incomplete list of his works:

The Secular Meaning of the Gospel: Based on an Analysis of Its Language
A Theology of the Jewish-Christian Reality (3 Volumes.)
The Edges of Language:An Essay in the Logic of a Religion
The Burden of Freedom
Theological Explorations
Christ in Our Place: The Substitutionary Character of Calvin's Doctrine of Reconciliation

See also 
American philosophy
List of American philosophers

References 

1924 births
1998 deaths
Writers from Norfolk, Virginia
20th-century Protestant theologians
American Episcopal priests
American Episcopal theologians
20th-century American philosophers
Death of God theologians
Holocaust theology
Temple University faculty
Academic staff of Heidelberg University
Harvard College alumni
University of Basel alumni
American people of Dutch descent
Seminary of the Southwest alumni
Christian Peace Conference members
Religious naturalists
Anglican philosophers